Melissa Straker-Taylor (born January 23, 1976) is a retired female track and field sprinter from Barbados, who twice represented her native country at the Summer Olympics: 1996 and 2000. She won a bronze medal in the women's 4x400 metres relay at the 1999 Pan American Games, alongside Joanne Durant, Andrea Blackett, and Tanya Oxley.

External links
 
 

1976 births
Living people
Barbadian female sprinters
Athletes (track and field) at the 1996 Summer Olympics
Athletes (track and field) at the 2000 Summer Olympics
Athletes (track and field) at the 1999 Pan American Games
Athletes (track and field) at the 1998 Commonwealth Games
Olympic athletes of Barbados
Commonwealth Games competitors for Barbados
Pan American Games bronze medalists for Barbados
Pan American Games medalists in athletics (track and field)
Medalists at the 1999 Pan American Games
Central American and Caribbean Games medalists in athletics
Olympic female sprinters